Dr Nigel Guenole is a Senior Lecturer and director of research for the Institute of Management at Goldsmiths, University of London.

Background
Guenole specializes in Talent Management and Applied Statistics and has work that has appeared in leading scientific journals including Industrial and Organizational Psychology: Perspectives on Science and Practice and Frontiers in Quantitative Psychology & Measurement, as well as in the public press including the Sunday Times. He is the current external examiner for organizational behaviour programs at the London School of Economics and University College London. He is a Chartered Psychologist and Associate Fellow of the British Psychological Society, registered with the Health & Care Professions Council, and a member of the Society for Industrial and Organizational Psychology in the United States.

Guenole specialises in the field of personality and performance, especially maladaptive personality at work and team personality Information sharing and privacy with big data Structural equation models, hierarchical linear models, item response theory, Social network models, Natural language processing. Guenole is also interested in the way businesses develop organisational capability in psychology and analytics. His most notable work; The Power of the People looks at this with work from Jonathan Ferrar and Sheri Feinzig. The book features insights from  HR analytics experts including Josh Bersin, John Boudreau, Tom Davenport, Mark Huselid, and Pat Wright. He is currently a senior lecturer at Goldsmiths, University of London.

Work
 The Power of People: How Successful Organizations Use Workforce Analytics To Improve Business Performance (with Jonathan Ferrar and Sheri Feinzig)

References

External links

Living people
Year of birth missing (living people)
Researchers in organizational studies
Academics of Goldsmiths, University of London
Academics of the University of London
British people of New Zealand descent
British psychologists